The Hofmeister House is a house in White Lake, South Dakota. It was built in the Queen Anne style by Simon Pexa in 1912. It was added to the National Register of Historic Places in 2007.

It has a wraparound porch. It was deemed notable as "a fine example of a Queen Anne style house built during the early 20th century in South Dakota."

References

Houses on the National Register of Historic Places in South Dakota
Queen Anne architecture in South Dakota
Houses completed in 1912
Houses in Aurora County, South Dakota
1912 establishments in South Dakota
National Register of Historic Places in Aurora County, South Dakota